Tioga may refer to:

United States communities
Tioga, California, former name of Bennettville, California
Tioga, Colorado
Tioga, Florida
Tioga, Iowa
Tioga, Louisiana
Tioga, New York, a town in Tioga County
Tioga County, New York, a county at the Pennsylvania border
Tioga, North Dakota, a city in Williams County
Tioga, Pennsylvania, a borough in Tioga County
Tioga County, Pennsylvania
Tioga, a neighborhood of Nicetown–Tioga in Philadelphia, Pennsylvania
Tioga, Texas, a town in Grayson County
Tioga, West Virginia
Tioga, Wisconsin, an unincorporated community

United States geography
Tioga Lake, a lake in Inyo National Forest in the Sierra Nevada mountains of California
Tioga Pass, a mountain pass in the Sierra Nevada
Tioga River (Michigan)
Tioga River (New Hampshire)
Tioga River (Chemung River), a river flowing through New York and Pennsylvania

Other uses
Tioga Hotel, a historic building in Merced, California, US
RV Tioga, an American coastal research vessel

See also